BrightStar Wisconsin Foundation Inc. is a Milwaukee, Wisconsin based non-profit that was formed by angel investor Tom Shannon and seven additional founding donors. It is a means of economic development by members of the state's private sector. "BrightStar was formed for the purpose of assisting WEDC in its mission to create family-sustaining jobs in the Wisconsin."

History
The foundation began by each of the eight original donors pledging 500,000 dollars to seed a fund for a total of 6 million dollars. The foundation also seeks tax deductible donations from wealthy individuals, foundations, and corporations willing to take the risk. The foundation reinvests in state companies all earnings and returns from its portfolio. Donors will not receive returns on their contributions.

See also

 Ward4
 Wisconsin Economic Development Corporation
 Wisconsin Investment Partners

References

External links

Financial services companies established in 2014
Technology companies established in 2014
Venture capital firms of the United States
Community foundations based in the United States
Organizations based in Milwaukee
2014 establishments in Wisconsin